Carol V. Rose is the executive director of the American Civil Liberties Union of Massachusetts. In 2013 Rose launched the ACLU Technology for Liberty strategy which looked at the civil liberty implications of technology. She is on the board of directors of the Partnership on AI, a coalition of technology companies including Facebook, Microsoft, and Amazon.

Early life and education 
Rose completed her bachelor's degree at Stanford University in 1983. She earned an Master's at the London School of Economics in 1985. Rose started her career in the late 1980s as an editorial writer for The Des Moines Register, a small daily newspaper in Iowa. While there she co-hosted a Democratic Party presidential candidate debate.  Some of her human interest stories were picked up by United Press International. She received a fellowship from the Institute of Current World Affairs, a family foundation which give grants to young people to study around the world. Rose used the grant to backpack thru Europe and Asia, and write for the foundation's newsletter from 1990 to 1992. She returned to the United States to earn her Juris Doctor from Harvard Law School in 1996. Rose was a clerk for United States Magistrate Patti B. Saris.

Career 
Rose worked as an attorney at Hill and Barlow, a Boston law firm specializing in emerging companies, real estate, and media and entertainment. Rose was employed as a starting associate from mid-1997 until 2002 when the firm dissolved. She served as co-chair of the Women in Communications Law for the American Bar Association Forum.

Rose was hired a year later by the American Civil Liberties Union in Massachusetts in 2003. She has focused on racial justice and equal opportunity for all, demanding equality for women, LGBTQ+ and immigrant people. Rose launched Technology for Liberty and Justice for All programs in 2013. Technology for Liberty enforces governmental transparency and reins the deployment of surveillance technology. It has strengthened the warrant requirements of government agencies looking to access digital information. It has challenged the government's use of the All Writs Act against technology. The American Civil Liberties Union has seen a surge in donations since the election of Donald Trump. After the US Government called for the ACLU to reunite children separated from their children, Rose told Boston public radio that "The government’s unconstitutional separation practice that led to this crisis and they need to clean it up". Rose spoke at the 2014 White House Conference on Big Data at Massachusetts Institute of Technology, discussing public privacy. She attended the 2016 Forum on Data Privacy at the MIT Internet Policy Research Initiative. On big data privacy, Rose has warned that "invariably, abuse will happen; invariably, people will find out about it".

She is a contributor to WBUR-FM, a local public radio affiliate.

References 

Stanford University alumni
Harvard University alumni
Alumni of the London School of Economics
Year of birth missing (living people)
Living people
21st-century American women lawyers
21st-century American lawyers